Dietmar Kantauer (born 19 May 1971) is an Austrian former footballer who played as a forward.

External links
 

1971 births
Living people
Austrian footballers
FC Gratkorn players
SV Mattersburg players
Association football forwards